Sotiris Konstantinidis (born 19 April 1977) is a Greek former professional footballer who played as a forward. His nickname was "doctor" because he had been studying medicine.

Club career
Konstantinidis started his career at Iraklis in 1994, where his very good performances with the club, attracted the interest of AEK Athens and Olympiacos. The player negotiated in the last six months before the end of his contract his transfer to a team of his choice and he agreed with AEK. But the president of Iraklis, Petros Theodoridis wanted to give him to Olympiacos, from whom he had an offer. Finally, the two sides ended up in the courts and Konstantinidis was left out of the squad for a few months. In the summer of 1999, the player was finally vindicated and signed with AEK. His most important goal with AEK was the one against Olympiacos in the 2002 Greek Cup final. During his presence at the club, he won 3 Cups and a Greek Super Cup in 1996.

Konstantinidis left AEK in 2005 and then played for Ionikos, where he played for 3 years and then signed for Panserraikos. In 2010 he played a season at Agrotikos Asteras. He then went to Ethnikos Gazoros until 2015 when he signed at Apollon Paralimnio. From 2017 he plays for Digenis Lakkomatos.

International career
Konstantinidis was a member of Greece U21 team that reached the final of the 1998 UEFA European Under-21 Championship in Romania, where he played in all 3 games.

Konstantinidis also made three appearances for Greece during 1999.

Honours

AEK Athens
Greek Cup: 1999–2000, 2001–02

References

External links

1977 births
Living people
Greek footballers
Greece international footballers
Greece under-21 international footballers
Super League Greece players
Football League (Greece) players
Iraklis Thessaloniki F.C. players
AEK Athens F.C. players
Ionikos F.C. players
Panserraikos F.C. players
Association football forwards
People from Sidirokastro
Footballers from Central Macedonia